Silence is a 2016 epic historical drama film directed by Martin Scorsese and with a screenplay by Jay Cocks and Scorsese, based on the 1966 novel of the same name by Shūsaku Endō. The film stars Andrew Garfield, Adam Driver, Liam Neeson, Tadanobu Asano, and Ciarán Hinds. The plot follows two 17th-century Jesuit priests who travel from Portugal to Edo-era Japan via Macau to locate their missing mentor and spread Catholic Christianity. The story is set in a time when it was common for the faith's Japanese adherents to hide from the persecution that resulted from the suppression of Christianity in Japan after the Shimabara Rebellion (1637–1638) against the Tokugawa shogunate. These are now called the kakure kirishitan, or "hidden Christians". It is the second filmed adaptation of Endō's novel, following a 1971 film of the same name.

The pre-production phase of the filmmaking for Silence went through a cycle of over two decades of setbacks and reassessments. After filming of The Wolf of Wall Street concluded in January 2013, Scorsese committed to following it up with Silence. On April 19, 2013, Scorsese indicated that he would begin production on Silence in 2014. Irwin Winkler was then announced as a producer, as were Randall Emmett and George Furla, who would provide financing through their company Emmett/Furla Films. Soon thereafter, planning was made for the film to be shot in Taiwan.

A long-time passion project for Scorsese, which he had developed for over 25 years, the film premiered in Rome on November 29, 2016, and was released in the United States on December 23, 2016. It received critical acclaim, with both the National Board of Review and American Film Institute selecting Silence as one of their top ten films of the year. It also received a nomination for the Academy Award for Best Cinematography. However, the film was a box office bomb, grossing just $22 million against its $50 million budget. Silence is the third of Scorsese's films about religious figures struggling with challenges of faith, following The Last Temptation of Christ (1988) and Kundun (1997).

Plot 

In the opening scene, veteran Portuguese Jesuit priest Cristóvão Ferreira is forced to watch as Japanese converts to Christianity are tortured to death for refusing to renounce their faith.

A few years later, at St. Paul's College in Macau, an Italian Jesuit priest, Alessandro Valignano, receives news that Ferreira renounced his faith in Japan. In disbelief, Ferreira's Portuguese pupils, the young Jesuit priests Sebastião Rodrigues and Francisco Garupe, set off to find him, guided by Kichijirō, a fisherman stranded in Macau. Kichijirō is seeking redemption, as he renounced his faith to save himself while the rest of his family was put to death.

Arriving in the Japanese village of Tomogi, the priests find local Christian populations driven underground in fear of "the Inquisitor." The villagers hide the two priests, but they are horrified when officials of the shogunate arrive to ferret out hidden Christians and force them to step on a fumi-e, a carved image of Christ. The villagers who refuse are left to drown on the shore and their bodies cremated so they cannot be properly buried. Garupe leaves for Hirado Island and Rodrigues to Gotō Island, the last place Ferreira was seen. 

Rodrigues finds the village destroyed and Kichijirō betrays him to the authorities, who imprison him in Nagasaki. Rodrigues is forced by the Inquisitor, the daimyo Inoue Masashige, to watch as converts are tortured. He is shocked to see an emaciated Garupe among them; as the Inquistor tries to compel Garupe to renounce his faith, the priest refuses and instead swims out to try and save a dying woman. The guards hold him underwater and he drowns. Rodrigues' faith in God is shaken. When Kichijirō is imprisoned alongside him, Rodrigues reluctantly takes his confession.

Rodrigues is taken to meet Ferreira, who has assimilated into Japanese society. Ferreira apostatized while being tortured to save his fellow Christians, and now believes that Christianity has no place in Japan. That night, Rodrigues is brought to watch five Christians being tortured. He learns that they have already apostatized but will continue to suffer until he also abandons his faith. Rodrigues struggles over whether it is self-centered to refuse to recant when doing so will end others' suffering. He hears the voice of Jesus, giving him permission to step on the fumi-e, and he does.

Rodrigues takes a Japanese name and wife and is tasked by the Inquisitor to assist Ferreira in his efforts to prevent Dutch traders from smuggling Christian paraphernalia into Dejima. He hears the voice of Jesus, who assures him that rather than remaining silent as Rodrigues had thought, Jesus also suffered alongside those who were killed.

Despite having apostatized, Rodrigues is forced by shogunate officials to prove that he is not practicing his former religion in secret. Kichijirō is arrested after being caught with a Christian amulet and Rodrigues never sees him again. The former priest lives out the remainder of his life in Japan. After his death, he is given a traditional Japanese funeral. His wife is allowed to place an offering in his hand to ward off evil spirits - she places the tiny crudely made crucifix that was given to him when he first came to Tomogi, indicating that in his heart, Rodrigues remained a Christian all his life.

Cast 

 Andrew Garfield as Sebastião Rodrigues (based on Giuseppe Chiara), who later in the film goes by the name Okada San'emon. In interviews, Garfield has spoken of his extensive year-long preparation for the role with James Martin, a practicing Jesuit priest working in New York. Garfield detailed that the preparation with Martin included extensive research and immersion in the Jesuit lifestyle and frame of mind, which the producers felt was essential to the accuracy of the film. Garfield, who is of slight to medium frame, reported losing 40 pounds to play the role following the rules of abstention which were outlined to him by Martin.
 Adam Driver as Francisco Garupe. Both Driver and Garfield went through a 7-day Jesuit silent prayer vigil arranged with the help of the Jesuit scholar Martin to prepare them for their roles in the film. Garfield, in an interview with Stephen Colbert, stated that both actors felt emaciated in preparing for their roles and that Driver lost close to 50 pounds in preparation to play his role in the film.
 Tadanobu Asano as The Interpreter
 Ciarán Hinds as the Jesuit Alessandro Valignano and the voice of Jesus
 Liam Neeson as the Jesuit Cristóvão Ferreira, who later in the film goes by the name Sawano Chūan.
 Shinya Tsukamoto as Mokichi. Tsukamoto felt that the relation of his character to Rodrigues was of central importance to the thematic content of the film. He adopted a lifestyle of fasting and abstention from social interaction throughout the production of the film. He reported that he and Garfield tried to stay in character on the sets even between takes.
 Issey Ogata as Inoue Masashige (based on the 17th-century Grand Councilor (ōmetsuke))
 Yōsuke Kubozuka as Kichijirō
 Nana Komatsu as Mónica (Haru)
 Ryo Kase as João (Chokichi)
 Katsuo Nakamura as The Monk
 Yoshi Oida as Ichizo
 Béla Baptiste as Dieter Albrecht (based on Engelbert Kaempfer, a chronicler who traveled with the Dutch East India Company)

Production

Development 
In an interview with America Magazine in December 2016, Scorsese stated that he first read Shūsaku Endō's novel Silence in 1989, when he was invited by Akira Kurosawa to Japan to play the part of Vincent van Gogh in Kurosawa's film Dreams (1990). Scorsese obtained the film rights soon afterwards.

Scorsese considered Silence a "passion project": it had been in development since 1990, two years after the release of his film The Last Temptation of Christ, which also carried strongly religious themes. When asked why he retained interest in the project for over 26 years, Scorsese said,As you get older, ideas go and come. Questions, answers, loss of the answer again and more questions, and this is what really interests me. Yes, the cinema and the people in my life and my family are most important, but ultimately as you get older, there's got to be more ... Silence is just something that I'm drawn to in that way. It's been an obsession, it has to be done ... it's a strong, wonderful true story, a thriller in a way, but it deals with those questions.In 2009, with the production beginning to coalesce, Scorsese and a production crew went to Nagasaki, Japan, visiting the original sites that served as the setting for Endō's novel. Additional location scouting was conducted in Canada. However, Silence entered a state of development hell soon afterwards, and Scorsese decided to work on Shutter Island and Hugo instead. In December 2011, Scorsese stated that Silence would be his next film. By March, although he originally put it on the back burner and consequently dropped out, Scorsese signed back on to The Wolf of Wall Street and opted to direct it ahead of Silence. However, at the time, Scorsese's publicist stated that Silence would come first. In May, the film picked up another producer in the recently revived Cecchi Gori Pictures, which placed the project first on its slate of upcoming films. Cecchi Gori was involved in pre-production for Silence, but years of unrelated legal disputes had interrupted its association to the film.

After filming of The Wolf of Wall Street concluded in January 2013, Scorsese committed to following it up with Silence. On April 19, 2013, it was announced that Scorsese would begin production on Silence in 2014, after a reputed 23-year wait. Irwin Winkler was announced as a producer the same day, as were Randall Emmett and George Furla, who would finance the production through their company Emmett/Furla Films. Paul Breuls' Corsan Films was also reportedly funding the project. Additionally, it was announced that the film would be shot in Taiwan.

Producer Irwin Winkler stated the choice to film in Taiwan was due to lower costs. "[The movie] was very, very expensive, and it was budgeted, because it takes place in 1670 in Japan. We got lucky and found out about Taipei, and in and around Taipei and Taiwan, we found great, great locations. The prices were very cheap, and we were able to make it for a price." Winkler disclosed that the tight budget forced many of the cast and crew, including himself, to work for minimum pay: "And all the actors, Liam Neeson, Adam Driver, everybody worked for scale. Marty worked for scale, I worked for under scale. We gave back money." James Martin, a Jesuit priest and published Catholic scholar, as well as Catholic scholar Liam Brockey, worked closely with the filmmakers to ensure an accurate portrayal of the Jesuits.

Legal claims 
Scorsese's complex filmmaking commitments to multiple film projects resulted in an early legal challenge before filming of Silence could be initiated. In August 2012, Cecchi Gori Pictures sued Scorsese over an alleged breach of contract agreements related to Silence. According to the company, in 1990 Scorsese signed a written agreement to direct Silence. Scorsese was supposed to shoot the film following 1997's Kundun, and Cecchi Gori Pictures had apparently invested more than $750,000 for this purpose. However, Scorsese chose to make Bringing Out the Dead, Gangs of New York, and The Aviator first.

In 2004, Scorsese purportedly signed deals to postpone the film further in order to direct The Departed and Shutter Island. In 2011, Scorsese ostensibly agreed to one more deal, delaying Silence to direct Hugo. Cecchi Gori Pictures asserted that Scorsese agreed to pay "substantial compensation and other valuable benefits" in order to first direct The Departed, Shutter Island, and Hugo. The company said the fees were "$1 million to $1.5 million per film plus up to 20 percent of Scorsese's backend compensation". The complaint was founded on the company's allegation that Scorsese failed to pay the fees agreed upon for Hugo, and that he breached the contract's terms by filming The Wolf of Wall Street ahead of Silence. Scorsese, via his representatives, responded, "The claims asserted are completely contradicted by, inconsistent with, and contrary to the express terms of an agreement entered into by the parties last year." He also denounced the lawsuit as a "media stunt" and a "meritless action". The lawsuit was settled on January 17, 2014. The terms of the settlement are sealed.

Writing 
This film marks the second adaptation of Shūsaku Endō's novel, which was previously adapted by Masahiro Shinoda into the 1971 film of the same name. Scorsese penned the initial screenplay in 1991 with co-writer and long-time collaborator Jay Cocks. However, they were unsatisfied with the script and conducted rewrites for an additional 15 years. Later, Endō's official translator, Van C. Gessel, who has translated eight of his novels, assisted as a consultant on the film. The screenplay as finally filmed was assessed in critical review as an accurate depiction of the novel as written by Endō. Religious historian Haruko Nawata Ward has indicated that the inclusion of the small crucifix in the deceased priest's hand at the end of the film was an auteur decision made by Scorsese not included in Endō's original book.

Casting 
Beginning in 2009 and into 2010, Daniel Day-Lewis, Benicio del Toro, and Gael García Bernal were in negotiations to star. In 2011, the film officially lost the involvement of Day-Lewis, del Toro, and García Bernal. In May 2013, Andrew Garfield and Ken Watanabe joined the cast with Watanabe as the priests' translator. However, due to scheduling conflicts, Watanabe was replaced by Tadanobu Asano in January 2015. In January 2014, Adam Driver and Liam Neeson joined the film, with Driver as Francisco Garupe, the second Jesuit priest, and Neeson as the priests' mentor, Cristóvão Ferreira.

Having completed the Spiritual Exercises of Ignatius of Loyola for playing a Jesuit in the movie, Andrew Garfield said how "What was really easy was falling in love with this person, was falling in love with Jesus Christ. That was the most surprising thing."

Filming 

In January 2012, Scorsese discussed the possibility of utilizing 3D, however reconsidered. By February 2014, Scorsese had begun scouting locations in Taiwan, with filming set for the summer, and eventually pushed back to early 2015. Principal photography took place in Taiwan from January 30 to May 15, 2015, using studios in Taipei and Taichung and locations in Hualien County.

On January 28, 2015, the production experienced an accident at Taiwan's CMPC Studios. According to a spokesperson for the film, a tragic incident occurred in one of the backlots of the production when a ceiling collapsed, which resulted in the death of one contracted employee and the injury of two others.

Scorsese and cinematographer Rodrigo Prieto drew inspiration from painters from the Baroque period when determining the color palettes of the film, using blue and cyan tones at the beginning and later a golden-yellow hue, which in Prieto's opinion, gave the film a sense of progression in color. While Prieto shot the landscapes and the actors using film stock, he resorted to digital when it came to the night scenes.

Prieto found some difficulties when shooting the film. With the weather constantly changing, he would have inconsistencies in terms of lighting that he solved by filming some sequences at night time that would be lit for either dusk or sunset. To simulate moonlight for many of the night scenes, Prieto used a rig of blue-green lights called the "UFO" and hung them on a crane.

Music 
The music for the film was composed by Kim Allen Kluge, the former music director at Quad City Symphony Orchestra, and Kathryn Kluge. Much of the soundtrack includes ambient nocturnal and ocean sounds repeated over several of the tracks. A 51-minute soundtrack of 25 tracks was released on February 17, 2017, by the recording studio for Rhino Warner Classics under ASIN release number B01N7S3IB9. An extended track of 12 minutes titled "Meditation" is included as the leading track on the soundtrack release.

Release 
Scorsese brokered several distribution deals when he attended the 2013 Cannes Film Festival. In July 2014, Paramount Pictures acquired distribution rights for the United States and optimistically eyed a late 2015 release. Discussing the film in March 2016, Winkler revealed the film was in the editing process and that the film would be released "at the end of the year", confirming a 2016 release date. In August 2016, Scorsese stated the film would be completed in October, and the 2016 release of the film depended on Paramount. Paramount Pictures released the first trailer for the film on November 22, 2016.

The world premiere of the film was held at the Pontifical Oriental Institute in Rome on November 29, followed by a special screening the next day in Vatican City. It received a limited release (in four theaters) on December 23, 2016, in order to qualify for 2017 Oscar nominations, which expanded to 1580 theaters on January 20.

Home media 
The film was released on Blu-ray and DVD on March 28, 2017, with a slightly earlier release date of March 14, 2017, set for digital streaming of the film.

Reception

Box office 
Silence grossed $7.1 million in the United States and Canada and $16.6 million in other territories for a worldwide total of $23.7 million, against a production budget of $40–50 million.

In North America, the film had its expansion alongside the openings of Monster Trucks, The Bye Bye Man and Sleepless, as well as the wide expansions of Live by Night and Patriots Day. The film was expected to gross $4–6 million from 747 theaters in its four-day MLK opening weekend. It ended up debuting to $1.9 million (a four-day total of $2.3 million), finishing 15th at the box office. Deadline Hollywood attributed the film's low opening to its 161-minute runtime and lack of major award nominations to create buzz. Similarly, The Hollywood Reporter noted that, unlike some of the other films released, Silence was playing in fewer cinemas and had been released at a time when the marketplace had "too many adult dramas" and "a lack of interest in the subject matter".

Critical response 
On review aggregator website Rotten Tomatoes, the film has an approval rating of 83% based on 286 reviews, and an average rating of 7.60/10. The site's critical consensus reads, "Silence ends Martin Scorsese's decades-long creative quest with a thoughtful, emotionally resonant look at spirituality and human nature that stands among the director's finest works." On Metacritic, which assigns a weighted average rating, the film has a score of 79 out of 100, based on 48 critics, indicating "generally favorable reviews". Audiences polled by CinemaScore gave the film an average grade of "A" on an A+ to F scale. Several critics have referred to the film as being among the finest films of Scorsese's career.

Matt Zoller Seitz of RogerEbert.com gave the film four out of four stars, stating that, "Silence is a monumental work, and a punishing one. It puts you through hell with no promise of enlightenment, only a set of questions and propositions, sensations and experiences ... This is not the sort of film you 'like' or 'don't like.' It's a film that you experience and then live with." Richard Roeper awarded the film four out of four stars, saying, "When Ferreira finally appears and we learn the truth about where he's been all this time, it further serves Scorsese's central theme about the conflict between adhering to one's sacred vows and traditional beliefs and doing the right thing, the prudent thing, the moral thing, on a very pragmatic level."

Several reviewers such as Justin Chang and Mark Kermode emphasized Scorsese's collaboration with his production crew and with his actors as contributing to the film's quality. Writing for the Los Angeles Times, Justin Chang called the film an "anguished masterwork" for Scorsese stating: "Working with such sterling past collaborators as editor Thelma Schoonmaker, production designer Dante Ferretti and cinematographer Rodrigo Prieto, Scorsese has done more than resurrect a vision of feudal Japan... Silence feels less like a feat of adaptation than an act of artistic submission". Mark Kermode writing for The Guardian indicated exemplary performances by the range of Japanese supporting actors in the cast stating: "The real stars however, are the Japanese cast, from Yōsuke Kubozuka's enigmatic wretch, Kichijirō ... to Yoshi Oida's devout elder Ichizo, to whose village these priests bring both salvation and suffering. As a smiling, silver-tongued interpreter, Tadanobu Asano is a superb foil to the inquisitor, Inoue, played with fly-swatting menace by a wheedling Issey Ogata".

Apart from the narrative qualities of the film, the filmmaking was also praised for the depth and thoroughness of its thematic content. Peter Travers of Rolling Stone, who assigned it 3½ stars out of four, wrote that Silence "offers frustratingly few answers but all the right questions" and argued that it is among the director's "most spiritually moving films to date". In Slant, Jesse Cataldo argued, "Tapping into the vast pool of vagueness and uncertainty that exists beneath the veneer of a rigid, righteous belief, Scorsese crafts a versatile, multifaceted work that encourages serious reflection and contemplation." Alissa Wilkinson of Vox wrote that Silence "is beautiful, unsettling and one of the finest religious movies ever made". John Ehrett of The Federalist praised the film highly, saying, "Silence is a must-see masterpiece about the paradoxes of faith." Ehrett further added, "Complex yet reverent, Silence explores the meanings and dilemmas of Christian faith, and decisively sets a new benchmark for religious films."

Some reviewers cited the legacy aspects of the film for Scorsese and compared Scorsese to iconic director Ingmar Bergman. Ty Burr of The Boston Globe said, "The movie's being promoted as the third in the director's unofficial trilogy of faith, after The Last Temptation of Christ (1988) and Kundun (1997), and it feels like a self-conscious masterpiece, a summing-up from a filmmaker who, at 74, may be thinking of his legacy." Joshua Rothkopf of Time Out London gave the film five stars out of five, saying, "Scorsese has hit the rare heights of filmmakers like Ingmar Bergman and Carl Theodor Dreyer, artists who find in religion a battleground that leaves even the strongest in tatters, compromised and broken." Emma Green of The Atlantic gave the film high praise, stating, "This is what makes Scorsese's film so radical and so unlike many movies about religion: It's actually art." Robbie Collin of The Telegraph gave the film five stars out of five, stating, "Scorsese's brutal spiritual epic will scald, and succor, your soul." Collin further added, "It's the kind of work a great filmmaker can only pull off with a lifetime's accrued expertise behind him". Brian Truitt of USA Today gave the film three-and-a-half stars, stating, "With the religious historical drama Silence, Martin Scorsese proves he's as masterful a filmmaker with men of God as he is with gangsters." Truitt also argued that the film "marks one of the deeper and most thoughtful projects in Scorsese's career".

The film also garnered criticism. Writing for Variety, Peter Debruge found major flaws with the film, writing, "Though undeniably gorgeous, it is punishingly long, frequently boring, and woefully unengaging at some of its most critical moments. It is too subdued for Scorsese-philes, too violent for the most devout, and too abstruse for the great many moviegoers who such an expensive undertaking hopes to attract." John Patterson of The Guardian stated in his review, "I fear that Silence expired in the womb during that long gestation period. It is beautiful to look at, but feels inert, humourless and overly devout (to say nothing of over-long; Masahiro Shinoda's 1971 adaptation got Shūsako Endō's 1966 novel on to film using 30 fewer minutes than Scorsese). Perhaps that leap toward the devout is needed to savour it fully–and I found I couldn't make it."

Top ten lists
Silence was listed on numerous American critics' top ten lists for 2016.

 1st – Justin Chang, Los Angeles Times
 1st – Rene Rodriguez, Miami Herald
 2nd – Joshua Rothkopf, Time Out New York
 2nd – Glenn Kenny, RogerEbert.com
 3rd – Mark Olsen, Los Angeles Times
 4th – Ben Kenigsberg, RogerEbert.com
 4th – William Bibbiani, CraveOnline
 5th – Peter Travers, Rolling Stone
 5th – K. Austin Collins, The Ringer
 5th – Stephanie Zacharek, Time
 5th – Brian Tallerico, RogerEbert.com
 5th – Bilge Ebiri, L.A. Weekly
 6th – Katie Rife, The A.V. Club
 7th – Keith Phipps, Uproxx
 8th – Jeffrey M. Anderson, San Francisco Examiner
 8th – Alissa Wilkinson, Vox
 8th – Witney Seibold, CraveOnline
 9th – Todd McCarthy, The Hollywood Reporter
 9th – Ignatiy Vishnevetsky, The A.V. Club
 10th – Peter Sobczynski, RogerEbert.com
 Top 10 (listed alphabetically, not ranked) –  Walter Addiego, San Francisco Chronicle
 Top 10 (listed alphabetically, not ranked) –  Stephen Whitty, The Star-Ledger

Industry reception 

Silence received an Academy Award nomination for Best Cinematography at the 89th Academy Awards. In addition to other competitive awards for which the film received accolades, the American Film Institute selected Silence as one of its ten Movies of the Year.

Analysis
Scorsese has stated in interviews that among the most difficult aspects of the film to represent were the spiritual themes presented in Endō's original book used for the film. The first version of the script he attempted to write with his co-writer Jay Cocks managed to get only midway through the material before being set aside as insufficiently sensitive to the spiritual aspects of the book. It took Scorsese many years to envision a way to approach an accurate and informed filming of the scenes, involving spiritual transitions among the actors in the film.

Caesar A. Montevecchio of the University of Notre Dame published a theological assessment of the spiritual themes in the film concentrating on the act of priestly renunciation depicted towards the end stating: "This climactic scene of Rodrigues trampling the fumi-e makes clear that Silence is as much about the object of Christian faith as it is the experience of that faith. As ambient and live sound are washed out entirely, Rodrigues hears the voice of Christ telling him to trample, that it was to be trampled upon that Christ came into the world. The object of faith becomes a Christ who is a hero of pity, who takes up the weakness and suffering of humankind as his cross, rather than a hero of triumphant resolve. The Jesus of Silence is one of utter kenosis (self-emptying), and one who in the mercy of that kenosis radically sympathizes with the weakness, and frailty, of human beings, even ones like Judas and Kichijirō."

Aaron Baker in his book A Companion to Martin Scorsese discussed aspects of the theological themes in the film stating that: "According to an analysis of the novel by the Japanese-American theologian Fumitaka Masuoka, it pivots on the idea that the silence of God is in fact the message of God, being not the silence of nihil, or 'nothingness', but rather 'the "accompaniment" for the forsaken and the suffering', and the concomitant silence of Christians quietly hoping for salvation. Implicit here is what Matsuoka terms 'an element of uncertainty', a possibility that the nihil of emptiness, meaninglessness, and hopelessness will eventually prevail. Uncertainty about the fate of the soul (or the self, for secularists) lies at the heart of human experience, injecting many a mind with the existential fear, trembling, and sickness unto death of which Søren Kierkegaard vividly wrote."

See also 
 Silence (1971 film), a Japanese film adaptation of Shūsaku Endō's novel, directed by Masahiro Shinoda.
 Black Robe, a 1991 Canadian film based on the novel by Brian Moore which deals with similar issues in 17th century Quebec.

References

External links 
 
 
 
 
 
 Official screenplay

2016 films
2016 drama films
2010s American films
2010s English-language films
2010s historical drama films
2010s Japanese-language films
American historical drama films
Catholic Church in Japan
Films about Catholic priests
Films about Christianity
Films based on Japanese novels
Films based on works by Shūsaku Endō
Films directed by Martin Scorsese
Films produced by Martin Scorsese
Films set in feudal Japan
Films set in the 1630s
Films set in the 1640s
Films set in the 1660s
Films set in the 17th century
Films set in Macau
Films set in the Edo period
Films shot in Taiwan
Films with screenplays by Jay Cocks
Films with screenplays by Martin Scorsese
Japan in non-Japanese culture
Jesuit history in Asia
Kadokawa Daiei Studio films
Paramount Pictures films
Persecution of Christians
Society of Jesus
StudioCanal films